Sigurd Røen (12 February 1909 in Rindal – 17 September 1992) was a Norwegian nordic skier who competed in the 1930s.

He won two gold medals at the 1937 FIS Nordic World Ski Championships in the nordic combined and the 4 × 10 km relay.

Cross-country skiing results

World Championships
 1 medal – (1 gold)

External links

World Championship results 
Brief biography of Sigurd Røen 

Norwegian male Nordic combined skiers
Norwegian male cross-country skiers
1909 births
1992 deaths
FIS Nordic World Ski Championships medalists in cross-country skiing
FIS Nordic World Ski Championships medalists in Nordic combined
People from Rindal
Sportspeople from Møre og Romsdal
20th-century Norwegian people